Music for Two is an album of duets by Edgar Meyer and Béla Fleck created and recorded while touring to support Perpetual Motion and released by Sony Classical in 2004.  Most of the pieces are original compositions by Meyer and Fleck, working alone and together.  They also perform four of their arrangements of music by J. S. Bach, an arrangement of a sonata by Henry Eccles, and piece by Miles Davis.

The album includes a bonus DVD with a video documentary of the making of Music For Two from footage taken by Fleck's brother Sascha Paladino and concert footage.

Track listing 
 "Bug Tussle" (Béla Fleck)
 "Invention No. 10" BWV 796 (Johann Sebastian Bach - arr:Fleck, Edgar Meyer)
 "Pile-up" (Fleck, Meyer)
 Prelude No. 24 BWV 869 from The Well-Tempered Clavier, Book I (Bach - arr:Fleck, Meyer)
 "Solar" (Miles Davis)
 "Blue Spruce" (Fleck)
 "Canon" (Meyer)
 "The One I Left Behind" (Fleck)
 Menuett I-II from Partia No. 1 BWV 825 (Bach - arr:Fleck, Meyer)
 Prelude No. 2 BWV 847 from The Well-Tempered Clavier, Book I (Bach - arr:Fleck, Meyer)
 "Palmyra" (Fleck, Meyer)
 "The Lake Effect" (Fleck)
 Largo from Sonata (Henry Eccles - arr:Meyer)
 Allegro Vivace from Sonata (Eccles - arr:Meyer)
 "Wrong Number" (Fleck, Meyer)
 "Woolly Mammoth" (Fleck, Meyer)
 "Wishful Thinking" (Meyer)

Personnel 
 Béla Fleck – banjo, guitar
 Edgar Meyer – double bass, piano

Chart

References 

2004 classical albums
Instrumental duet albums
2004 live albums
Béla Fleck albums
Edgar Meyer albums
2004 video albums
Documentary films about classical music and musicians